Robert Golob (born 23 January 1967) is a Slovenian businessman and politician, serving as Prime Minister of Slovenia and leader of the Freedom Movement since 2022.

Early life and education
Golob obtained his PhD in electrical engineering at the University of Ljubljana in 1994. After his studies, he was a post-doctoral Fulbright scholar in the United States at the Georgia Institute of Technology in Atlanta.

Business career
In 2004, Golob co-founded an energy trading company GEN-I, which is state-controlled, and where he remained chairman until 2021.

Political career

Between May 1999 and June 2000, Golob was the State Secretary at the Ministry of Economic Affairs in the government led by prime minister Janez Drnovšek of the LDS party. In 2002, he was elected to the City Council of Nova Gorica, a position he held until 2022. In 2011, Golob joined the Positive Slovenia party, founded by the mayor of Ljubljana Zoran Janković. In 2013–14, with the rising tensions within the party between its founder and chairman Zoran Janković and Prime Minister Alenka Bratušek, Golob played a mediating role between the two factions. With the final break within the party in April 2014, he joined the breakaway Party of Alenka Bratušek (SAB), becoming one of its vice-presidents. After the poor performance of SAB in the subsequent 2014 election, winning only four seats, he moved away from politics on the national level, remaining active only at the local level in the municipality of Nova Gorica; he chaired the neighborhood assembly of Kromberk-Loke between 2010 and 2014, remaining one of its members until 2022.

When his mandate as chairman of GEN-I ended in 2021, and after not receiving another one, Golob decided to take an active role in politics again. In January 2022, he took over the small extraparliamentary Green Actions Party and renamed it to Freedom Movement. On 24 April 2022, in the 2022 Slovenian parliamentary election, the Freedom Movement won 41 seats in the 90-seat National Assembly.

On 25 May 2022, Robert Golob was elected by the parliament as Prime Minister of Republic of Slovenia.

References

External links

|-

1967 births
Living people
People from Šempeter pri Gorici
No local image but image on Wikidata
Slovenian businesspeople
University of Ljubljana alumni
Positive Slovenia politicians
Prime Ministers of Slovenia
Fulbright alumni